The Changhe Q7 is a mid-size crossover produced by Changhe unveiled during the 2017 Guangzhou Auto Show in China. and launched in the Chinese market in March 2018.

Overview

Power of the Changhe Q7 comes from a 1.5 liter inline-four petrol turbo engine producing 110kW and 200Nm of torque.

The pricing of the Changhe Q7 starts at 87,900 yuan and ends at 148,900 yuan. 

Styling of the Changhe Q7 is controversial as the Changhe Q7 heavily resembles a Range Rover.

References

External links 
 
 

Mid-size sport utility vehicles
Crossover sport utility vehicles
Changhe vehicles
2010s cars
Cars introduced in 2017
Cars of China